William Anthony Paddon,  (July 10, 1914 – January 5, 1995) was a Canadian surgeon and the seventh lieutenant governor of Newfoundland from 1981 to 1986.

Born in Indian Harbour, Labrador, Newfoundland, the son of Dr. Harry Locke Paddon (1881-1939) and Mina Gilchrist, a physician and a nurse, respectively, with the International Grenfell Association. He received a Bachelor of Science in 1936 from Trinity College in  Hartford, Connecticut. He received his Doctor of Medicine in 1940 from New York Medical College. During World War II, he served with the Royal Canadian Navy as a surgeon.

After the war, he returned to Labrador with the International Grenfell Association, serving as doctor at the North West River hospital. He was the director of the IGA from 1960 until his retirement in 1978. He married Sheila Fortescue, also an IGA nurse.

In 1981, he was the first, and so far only Labradorian to be appointed Lieutenant-Governor of Newfoundland and Labrador. He served until 1986.

In 1986, he published his autobiography, Labrador Doctor: My Life with the Grenfell Mission.

In 1977 he received an honorary doctorate from Memorial University. In 1978, he was made a Member of the Order of Canada and was promoted to Officer in 1988.

On 21 June 2014, a new building at CFS St. John's was named after him.

References

External links 
Biography at Government House The Governorship of Newfoundland and Labrador

1914 births
1995 deaths
Canadian military personnel from Newfoundland and Labrador
Canadian Anglicans
Canadian surgeons
Lieutenant Governors of Newfoundland and Labrador
Officers of the Order of Canada
Trinity College (Connecticut) alumni
New York Medical College alumni
20th-century surgeons
Royal Canadian Navy officers
Royal Canadian Navy personnel of World War II